The 1937 Masters Tournament was the fourth Masters Tournament, held April 1–4 at Augusta National Golf Club in Augusta, Georgia.

Opening with a six-under 66, Byron Nelson led after the first and second rounds, but a 75 on Saturday dropped him four strokes back, in a tie for third. On the final nine on Sunday, he gained six strokes on third round leader Ralph Guldahl over two holes and won the tournament by two strokes. Compared to Guldahl's 5–6 (double bogey, bogey), Nelson played the 12th and 13th holes 2–3 (birdie, eagle), respectively. The Nelson Bridge, over Rae's Creek departing the 13th tee, was dedicated in 1958 to commemorate the feat.

At age 25, this was the first of Nelson's five major titles; he won the Masters again in 1942, which was not held again until 1946. Guldahl rebounded and won three majors over the next two years: the U.S. Open in 1937 and 1938 and the Masters in 1939.

Sam Snead made his Masters debut and finished 18th. The purse was $5,000 with a winner's share of $1,500.

Field
1. Masters champions
Gene Sarazen (2,4,6,7,9,10), Horton Smith (7,9,10,12)

2. U.S. Open champions
Tommy Armour (4,6,9,10), Billy Burke (9,10), Bobby Jones (3,4,5), Willie Macfarlane, Tony Manero (10,12), Sam Parks Jr. (7,9), George Sargent

3. U.S. Amateur champions
Lawson Little (5,9), Jess Sweetser (5,a)

4. British Open champions
Jock Hutchison (6), Denny Shute (6,9,10,12)

5. British Amateur champions

6. PGA champions
Johnny Revolta (7,9,10), Paul Runyan (7,9,10)

7. Members of the U.S. 1935 Ryder Cup team
Ky Laffoon (9,10), Henry Picard (9,10), Craig Wood (9,12)

Olin Dutra (2,6) and Walter Hagen (2,4,6,9) did not play.

8. Members of the U.S. 1936 Walker Cup team
Charlie Yates (a)

Albert Campbell (9,11,a), George Dunlap (a), Walter Emery (a), Johnny Fischer (11,a), Harry Givan (a), Johnny Goodman (10,11,a), Francis Ouimet (a), Reynolds Smith (a), George Voigt (11,a) and Ed White (a) did not play.

9. Top 30 players and ties from the 1936 Masters Tournament
Harry Cooper (10), Wiffy Cox (10), Bobby Cruickshank, Ed Dudley, Al Espinosa, Vic Ghezzi (110, Ray Mangrum (10), Jug McSpaden (10,12), Byron Nelson, Jimmy Thomson (10,12), Al Watrous

Johnny Dawson (a), Johnny Farrell (2,10), Dick Metz (10) and Orville White did not play.

10. Top 30 players and ties from the 1936 U.S. Open
Herman Barron, Al Brosch, Clarence Clark, Ralph Guldahl, Tom Kerrigan, Chuck Kocsis (a), Frank Moore, Jack Munger (a), Felix Serafin

Zell Eaton, Jerry Gianferante, Willie Goggin and Macdonald Smith did not play

11. 1936 U.S. Amateur quarter-finalists
John Riddell (a)

Ray Billows (a) and Russell Martin (a) did not play.

12. 1936 PGA Championship quarter-finalists
Jimmy Hines, Bill Mehlhorn

13. Two players, not already qualified, with the best scoring average in the winter part of the 1937 PGA Tour
Leonard Dodson, Sam Snead

14 Foreign invitations
Francis Francis (a)

Additional invitation
Fred Haas (a) winner of 1936 Canadian Amateur Championship

Round summaries

First round
Thursday, April 1, 1937

Source:

Second round
Friday, April 2, 1937

Source:

Third round
Saturday, April 3, 1937

Source:

Final round
Sunday, April 4, 1937

Final leaderboard

Sources:

Scorecard
Final round

Cumulative tournament scores, relative to par
Source:

References

External links
Masters.com – past winners and results
Augusta.com – 1937 Masters leaderboard and scorecards

1937
1937 in golf
1937 in American sports
1937 in sports in Georgia (U.S. state)
April 1937 sports events